Ombrophila is a genus of fungi in the family Helotiaceae. The genus contains 11 species. Elias Fries circumscribed Ombrophila in 1849.

Species

References

Helotiaceae